Wencheng is one of the five counties in the prefecture-level city of Wenzhou, in southern Zhejiang province, with a population of 250,000 .

The county is located in the southwest of Wenzhou city proper, and borders Ruian city, Taishun County and Pingyang County.

Many natives of Wencheng migrated to Europe in the 1990s, most of which are now living in the Netherlands, Italy, France, and Spain

Mountainous areas account for 82.5% of the total land area of Wencheng, with the highest peak of 1362 meters above sea in Shiyanglinchang (North West Wencheng)

Administrative divisions
Towns:

 Daxue (大峃镇), Baizhangji (百丈漈镇), Nantian (南田镇), Xikengshezu (西坑畲族镇), Huangtan (黄坦镇), Shanxi (珊溪镇), Juyu (巨屿镇), Yuhu (玉壶镇), Likou (峃口镇), Zhourang (周壤镇), Tonglingshan (铜铃山镇), Eryuan (二源镇)

Townships:
 Zhoushanshezu (周山畲族乡), Guishan (桂山乡), Shuanggui (双桂乡), Pinghe (平和乡), Gongyang (公阳乡)

Climate

References

 
County-level divisions of Zhejiang
Geography of Wenzhou